The Woolsey Finnell Bridge is a four-lane, girder bridge spanning the Black Warrior River along U.S. Route 82 (McFarland Boulevard) in Tuscaloosa, Alabama that opened in 1961. The bridge takes its name from the former state director of highways for Alabama, Woolsey Finnell.  This is one of only four vehicular bridges spanning the Black Warrior in Tuscaloosa.

Due to both the age of the structure as well as the bridge operating well above its designed capacity by the 1990s, calls for a new span across the river to alleviate some of the congestion was proposed. Both the Warrior Loop and the Paul Bryant Bridge are expected to absorb some of the 55,000 daily trips made across the bridge upon their respective completions.

See also
 List of crossings of the Black Warrior River

References

Bridges completed in 1961
Transportation in Tuscaloosa, Alabama
Woolsey Finnell Bridge
Buildings and structures in Tuscaloosa, Alabama
Road bridges in Alabama
U.S. Route 82
Bridges of the United States Numbered Highway System
Girder bridges in the United States
Transportation buildings and structures in Tuscaloosa County, Alabama
1961 establishments in Alabama